Chebseh may refer to:
 Chebseh-ye Bozorg, village in Iran
 Chebseh-ye Kuchek, village in Iran